Ellen Ek (born 4 July 1997) is a Swedish diver. She competed in the women's 10 metre platform event at the 2019 World Aquatics Championships.

References

1997 births
Living people
Swedish female divers
Place of birth missing (living people)
European Games competitors for Sweden
Divers at the 2015 European Games